This is a list of people to manage Airdrieonians since their formation as 'Airdrie United' in 2002.

Managers

Caretaker managers

References

 
Managers
Airdrieonians